Hakea commutata is a shrub in the family Proteaceae native to Western Australia. A variable species in shape and  growing requirements, including mallee heath, sand and along creek lines.

Description
Leaves are bluish-green with a whitish powdery covering, smooth or sparsely covered in coarse rough hairs and small protuberances. The inflorescence have 8-12 flowers either in leaf axils or at the end of branches.
Red-pink and cream-white flowers appear from September to November, occasionally into December. The seed takes a mean time of 23 days to germinate.

Taxonomy
Hakea commutata  was first formally described by botanist Ferdinand von Mueller in 1865 as part of the work Fragmenta Phytographiae Australiae. The only synonym is Hakea nodosa.
The specific epithet commutata is a Latin word  meaning "with change"  Mueller adopted the epithet  falsely believing the leaves in this species  were variable.

Distribution
It is endemic to an area in the Wheatbelt and Goldfields-Esperance regions from about Toodyay in the north to Fitzgerald River National Park in the south west and Cape Arid National Park in the south east. It is found along watercourses and among granite outcrops growing in sandy-loam or clay soils and is usually part of mallee heath communities or mallee communities over laterite.

Conservation status

Hakea commutata is classified as "not threatened" by the Western Australian GovernmentDepartment of Parks and Wildlife.

References

commutata
Eudicots of Western Australia
Plants described in 1865
Taxa named by Ferdinand von Mueller